3D Family is an album by David Murray released on the Swiss Hat Hut label. It was released in 1980 as a double LP and features a live performance by Murray, Johnny Mbizo Dyani and Andrew Cyrille recorded September 3, 1978, at the Jazzfestival Willisau.

Reception
The Allmusic review by Brian Olewnick awarded the album 4 stars, stating, "If anything, the length of the pieces allows Murray to drift on a bit longer than necessary at times. As often as not, though, he manages to wring out some extra juice, making it easy for the listener to grant him significant slack. Still in his mid-twenties, this recording captures him moving toward the crest of his powers (evidenced in his octets) and is one of the better trio dates in his discography. Recommended, as much for the marvelous "sidemen" as for Murray himself".

Track listing

September 3, 1978, at the Jazzfestival Willisau

Personnel
David Murray – tenor saxophone
Johnny Mbizo Dyani – bass
Andrew Cyrille – percussion

References

1979 live albums
David Murray (saxophonist) live albums
Hathut Records live albums